Ziegelbach may refer to:

Ziegelbach (Brenz), a river of Baden-Württemberg, Germany, tributary of the Brenz
Auer (Odenwald), other name Ziegelbach, a river in the Odenwald, Hesse, Germany
Ziegelbach (Bad Wurzach), a district of Bad Wurzach, a town of Baden-Württemberg, Germany